Shen Chunyao (born May 1960) is a Chinese politician who is the chairperson of the  since April 2017.

He was a member of the Standing Committee of the 10th, 11th, 12th and 13th National People's Congress. He was an alternate member of the 19th Central Committee of the Chinese Communist Party.  He was a representative of the 20th National Congress of the Chinese Communist Party.

Biography
Shen was born in Ye County (now Laizhou), Shandong, in May 1960, and graduated from Jilin University and then the Department of Law, China University of Political Science and Law. 

Shen worked in the State Council before being assigned to the National People's Congress. He was a member of the National People's Congress Financial and Economic Affairs Committee in March 2003 and subsequently a member of the National People's Congress Legal Committee in October 2004. He also served as deputy chairperson of the Legislative Affairs Committee of the Standing Committee of the National People's Congress from April 2007 to December 2008 and director of the Research Office of the General Office of the Standing Committee of the National People's Congress from December 2008 to April 2011. He was promoted to deputy secretary-general of the Standing Committee of the National People's Congress. in April 2011.

References

1960 births
Living people
People from Laizhou
Jilin University alumni
China University of Political Science and Law alumni
People's Republic of China politicians from Shandong
Chinese Communist Party politicians from Shandong
Members of the Standing Committee of the 10th National People's Congress
Members of the Standing Committee of the 11th National People's Congress
Members of the Standing Committee of the 12th National People's Congress
Members of the Standing Committee of the 13th National People's Congress
Alternate members of the 19th Central Committee of the Chinese Communist Party